Stromatocyphella is a genus of fungus in the family Marasmiaceae. The genus contains three species found in North America.

See also

List of Marasmiaceae genera

References

Marasmiaceae
Agaricales genera